Mandyakoppalu is a small village and road intersection in Mandya district of Karnataka state, India.

Location
Mandyakoppalu is located between Srirangapatna and Bannur on the Srirangapatna - Bannur road. This road goes on the northern side of the Cauvery river.

The village is 21 km from Mandya town.

Postal code
There is a post office at Mandyakoppalu and the pin code is 571415 (Arakere).

Nearby villages
Vadiyandahalli (2 KM), Mahadevapura (3 KM), Arakere (3 KM), Hangarahalli (4 KM), Paramandahalli (4 KM).

See also
 Karighatta Road
 Kodagahalli

References

Villages in Mandya district